Derek Whyte (born 31 August 1968) is a Scottish former footballer, who played for Celtic, Middlesbrough, Aberdeen and Partick Thistle. He also won twelve caps for Scotland during his 18-year playing career. He participated at Euro 1992, Euro 1996 and the 1998 FIFA World Cup.

Whyte joined Celtic on 14 May 1985 as a 16-year-old from the Celtic Boys Club. A defender with the greatest of promise, described as the new Billy McNeill, his form slumped towards the end of his time at the club. He left at the end of the 1991–92 season when an agreeable new contract was not forthcoming. He was sold to Middlesbrough for £900,000 where he returned to the early good form he had shown at Celtic.

After 5 seasons on Teesside, Whyte left Middlesbrough to return to Scotland, joining Aberdeen for an undisclosed fee and a four and a half-year contract in December 1997. He was appointed team captain at Pittodrie and remained there until 2002, when he joined Partick Thistle on a free transfer.

Along with Gerry Britton, Whyte was appointed joint player-manager of the Jags after Gerry Collins was sacked in November 2003. In March 2004 he decided to hang up his playing boots to concentrate on management. Whyte and Britton were sacked by Thistle in December 2004. Soon afterwards he moved to the United Arab Emirates. He is now a pundit on ShowSports, the sports channel on the Showtime Arabia network, based in Dubai, and writes a weekly column for the UAE's leading daily newspaper 7DAYS.

References

External links

Scotland U21 stats at Scottish FA

Living people
Footballers from Glasgow
Scottish footballers
1968 births
Celtic F.C. players
Middlesbrough F.C. players
Aberdeen F.C. players
Partick Thistle F.C. players
Scottish football managers
Partick Thistle F.C. managers
Scotland international footballers
Scotland B international footballers
UEFA Euro 1992 players
UEFA Euro 1996 players
1998 FIFA World Cup players
Premier League players
English Football League players
Scottish Premier League players
Association football defenders
Scottish Football League players
Scottish Premier League managers
Scotland under-21 international footballers
Scotland youth international footballers